James William Gazlay (July 23, 1784 – June 8, 1874) was a U.S. Representative from Ohio for one term from 1823 to 1825.

Biography 
Born in New York City, Gazlay moved with his parents to Dutchess County, New York, in 1789.
He attended the common schools, after which he pursued an academic course.
He studied law in Poughkeepsie, New York.
He was admitted to the bar in 1809 and practiced.
He moved to Cincinnati, Ohio, in 1813 and continued the practice of law.

Gazlay was elected as a Jackson Republican to the Eighteenth Congress (March 4, 1823 – March 3, 1825).
His opponent was Ohio State Senator and future President William Henry Harrison. He was an unsuccessful candidate for reelection in 1824 to the Nineteenth Congress.
Edited a weekly paper called the Western Tiller in 1826 and 1827.
He engaged in literary pursuits.
He died in Cincinnati, Ohio, June 8, 1874.
He was interred in Spring Grove Cemetery.

Sources

1784 births
1874 deaths
Politicians from Cincinnati
19th-century American newspaper publishers (people)
Ohio lawyers
Burials at Spring Grove Cemetery
Democratic-Republican Party members of the United States House of Representatives from Ohio
19th-century American politicians
19th-century American lawyers